Jesús Alejo López (born May 5, 1996) is a Mexican professional baseball infielder in the Cincinnati Reds organization. He made his Major League Baseball (MLB) debut in 2021.

Amateur career
López attended Greenway High School in Phoenix, Arizona. He was drafted by the Cincinnati Reds in the 27th round of the 2015 Major League Baseball draft.

Professional career
López made his professional debut that year with the Arizona League Reds, where he slashed a torrid .419/.526/.484. In 2016, López played for the rookie-level Billings Mustangs, posting a .273/.342/.327 slash line with one home run and 29 RBI. He returned to Billings for the 2017 season, and hit .300/.388/.455 with four home runs and 33 RBI. For the 2018 season, López played for the Single-A Dayton Dragons, slashing .321/.375/.406 in 65 games. In 2019, he played for the High-A Daytona Tortugas and batted .287/.353/.347 with two home runs and fifty RBI.

López did not play in a game in 2020 due to the cancellation of the minor league season because of the COVID-19 pandemic. López began the started 2021 with the Double-A Chattanooga Lookouts before being promoted to the Triple-A Louisville Bats after hitting .362 in Chattanooga.

On June 28, 2021, López was selected to the 40-man roster and promoted to the major leagues for the first time after hitting .358/.436/.526 with two home runs and 14 RBI in Louisville. López made his Major League debut that day as a pinch hitter against the Philadelphia Phillies. López faced relief pitcher Bailey Falter, where he connected on the first pitch he saw for a single.  López finished his rookie campaign with a .261/.261/.261 slash across 14 games.

López appeared in 59 games for Cincinnati in 2022. In 145 at-bats, he batted .262/.314/.331 with 1 home run and 10 RBI.

On February 8, 2023, López was designated for assignment by the Reds following the acquisition of Will Benson. On February 14, López cleared waivers and was sent outright to Triple-A Louisville.

References

External links

1996 births
Living people
American sportspeople of Mexican descent
Arizona League Reds players 
Baseball players from Mexico City
Billings Mustangs players
Chattanooga Lookouts players
Cincinnati Reds players
Dayton Dragons players
Daytona Tortugas players
Louisville Bats players
Major League Baseball infielders
Major League Baseball players from Mexico
Sultanes de Monterrey players